Dariusz Góral (born 20 April 1991 in Wrocław) is a Polish former professional footballer who played as a striker.

Career

Club
Góral made his Ekstraklasa debut on 16 October 2009. He was loaned to MKS Kluczbork from Śląsk Wrocław on a one-year deal in 2010.

In July 2011, he was loaned to Polonia Bytom on a one-year deal.

References

External links
 

1991 births
Polish footballers
Śląsk Wrocław players
MKS Kluczbork players
Polonia Bytom players
Ekstraklasa players
I liga players
III liga players
IV liga players
Living people
Sportspeople from Wrocław
Association football forwards